The First Unitarian Congregation of Toronto is a Unitarian Universalist (UU) congregation in Toronto, Ontario, Canada. It is affiliated with the Canadian Unitarian Council. It is the largest of six UU congregations and fellowships in the Greater Toronto Area.

History
The congregation was founded in 1845, the second in Canada after the Montreal congregation. The congregation originally operated in a building on George Street then but moved to 216 Jarvis Street in 1854. In 1952, eight parishioners founded the Elizabeth Fry Society after hearing a speech by Agnes Macphail. In 1949 the congregation moved to its last building at 175 St. Clair Avenue West. The congregation is currently on the move, temporarily meeting at Oakwood Collegiate Institute while the new building at 473 Oakwood Ave is being renovated.

Building
In 1993, the building underwent extensive renovations. The main space, named Sunderland Hall, was changed from an east-west to a north-south orientation. Workman Hall, which used to back on to Sunderland Hall as a disused stage was remodelled as a separate space and meeting area. Office and classroom spaces were updated and expanded. An airy narthex was added on the side of the building facing St. Clair including a tower with a stained glass window commissioned for the renovated building. The work is entitled Radiance, Reflection, Revelation by artist Sarah Hall. It was later nominated for the Ontario Arts Council's Jean Chalmers Award as the single largest commission for a stained glass work in the Toronto area.

In September 2007, the city's heritage preservation committee proposed that the building be designated as a heritage property along with eight other church properties in the neighbourhood. At the request of the church's board of trustees, this designation was deferred until the church members could confer on the matter.

Governance

The congregation is led by a nine-member Board of Trustees including a President and Vice-President. There is also a Treasurer, considered an ex-officio Board member. Trustees are elected by the congregation to three-year terms with the possibility of one renewal. Minister(s) of the church are considered as employees and are not members of the Board (although they frequently attend board meetings). The Board is responsible for forming policy, making decisions on behalf of the congregation and monitoring the congregation's operations within those policies.  All Trustees are volunteers.

The congregation holds annual meetings to elect new Board members and review and approve the annual budget. Other issues affecting the entire congregation are also voted upon, as the need arises, at special meetings of the congregation.

Members

One of the prominent founding members was Joseph Workman, known as the "Father of Canadian Psychiatry". Other notable members include:
Arthur Lismer, a painter, part of the Group of Seven
Sir Francis Hincks, politician
Emily Stowe, the first female doctor to practise in Canada
William Dennison, the mayor of Toronto
Donald Macdonald
Michael Cassidy, leader of the Ontario New Democratic Party.

References

External links
 First Unitarian Congregation web site

First Unitarian Congregation of Toronto
Unitarian Universalist churches in Canada
Postmodern architecture in Canada
1845 establishments in Canada